Marei Al Ramly (born December 4, 1977 in Libya) is a Libyan football midfielder. He currently plays for Al-Nasr, and is a member of the Libya national football team.

External links

1977 births
Living people
Libyan footballers
Association football midfielders
Libya international footballers
2006 Africa Cup of Nations players
Al-Nasr SC (Benghazi) players
Libyan Premier League players
Al Akhdar SC players